Texas Journal on Civil Liberties & Civil Rights  is a biannual student-produced law review at the University of Texas School of Law (Austin, TX, United States). It was established in 1992 as the Texas Forum on Civil Liberties & Civil Rights and covers the status of civil rights law and analyses of the relevant issues surrounding these laws.

In addition to the biannual publication, the journal hosts an annual symposium. It also hosts speeches, brown bag events, and other opportunities to expose law students to this area of law.

References

External links
 

American law journals
University of Texas School of Law
Biannual journals
Publications established in 1992
English-language journals
Constitutional law journals
Law journals edited by students